Crenitis morata is a species of water scavenger beetle in the family Hydrophilidae.

References

Further reading

 

Hydrophilinae
Articles created by Qbugbot
Beetles described in 1890